Smithfield, an electoral district of the Legislative Assembly in the Australian state of New South Wales, was established in 1988. It was abolished in 2015 and largely replaced by Prospect.


Members

Election results

2011

Elections in the 2000s

2007

2003

Elections in the 1990s

1999

1995

1991

1990 by-election

Elections in the 1980s

1988

Notes

References

New South Wales state electoral results by district